Zabłocie may refer to:

Zabłocie, Bolesławiec County in Lower Silesian Voivodeship (south-west Poland)
Zabłocie, Głogów County in Lower Silesian Voivodeship (south-west Poland)
Zabłocie, Kłodzko County in Lower Silesian Voivodeship (south-west Poland)
Zabłocie, Silesian Voivodeship (south Poland)
Zabłocie, Kuyavian-Pomeranian Voivodeship (north-central Poland)
Zabłocie, Gmina Biała Podlaska in Lublin Voivodeship (east Poland)
Zabłocie, Gmina Kodeń in Lublin Voivodeship (east Poland)
Zabłocie, Biłgoraj County in Lublin Voivodeship (east Poland)
Zabłocie, Podlaskie Voivodeship (north-east Poland)
Zabłocie, Hajnówka County in Podlaskie Voivodeship (north-east Poland)
Zabłocie, Łask County in Łódź Voivodeship (central Poland)
Zabłocie, Radomsko County in Łódź Voivodeship (central Poland)
Zabłocie, Rawa County in Łódź Voivodeship (central Poland)
Zabłocie, Wieluń County in Łódź Voivodeship (central Poland)
Zabłocie, Lublin County in Lublin Voivodeship (east Poland)
Zabłocie, Puławy County in Lublin Voivodeship (east Poland)
Zabłocie, Lesser Poland Voivodeship (south Poland)
Zabłocie, Świętokrzyskie Voivodeship (south-central Poland)
Zabłocie, Legionowo County in Masovian Voivodeship (east-central Poland)
Zabłocie, Radom County in Masovian Voivodeship (east-central Poland)
Zabłocie, Siedlce County in Masovian Voivodeship (east-central Poland)
Zabłocie, Greater Poland Voivodeship (west-central Poland)
Zabłocie, Lubusz Voivodeship (west Poland)
Zabłocie, Słupsk County in Pomeranian Voivodeship (north Poland)
Zabłocie, Warmian-Masurian Voivodeship (north Poland)

See also
Záblatí (Bohumín), a village in the Czech Republic
Zabolottia, Volyn Oblast, a village in Ukraine